In Greek mythology, Cleochus (Ancient Greek: Κλεόχου or Κλέοχον) was the name shared by two individuals:

 Cleochus, the Cretan father of the nymph Aria, mother of Miletus by Apollo. When Areia gave birth to her son she hid him in a bed of smilax, Cleochus found the child there and named him Miletus after the plant. Clement of Alexandria quotes Leandrios saying that Cleochus was buried within the temple enclosure of Didyma in Miletus.
 Cleochos, one of the followers of Dionysus in the Indian War against the Indian king Deriades.

Notes

References 

 Apollodorus, The Library with an English Translation by Sir James George Frazer, F.B.A., F.R.S. in 2 Volumes, Cambridge, MA, Harvard University Press; London, William Heinemann Ltd. 1921. . Online version at the Perseus Digital Library. Greek text available from the same website
Nonnus of Panopolis, Dionysiaca translated by William Henry Denham Rouse (1863-1950), from the Loeb Classical Library, Cambridge, MA, Harvard University Press, 1940.  Online version at the Topos Text Project.
Nonnus of Panopolis, Dionysiaca. 3 Vols. W.H.D. Rouse. Cambridge, MA., Harvard University Press; London, William Heinemann, Ltd. 1940–1942. Greek text available at the Perseus Digital Library.
Titus Flavius Clemens, Exhortation against the Pagans translated by Butterworth, G W. Loeb Classical Library Volume 92. Cambridge, MA. Harvard University Press. 1919. Online version at theio.com

Cretan characters in Greek mythology